Gladiators: Springbok Challenge 2 was the second Springbok Challenge series for South African Gladiators and UK Gladiators.

Contenders

United Kingdom
 Pauline Shirt — Series 7 quarter-finalist
 Louise Land
 Louise Raines — Series 7 runner-up
 Andreya Wharry† — Series 5 champion and Springbok Challenge 1 champion
 Maria Ward1 — Series 7 semi-finalist
 Trudi Ballentine — Series 7 semi-finalist
 Phil Norman — Series 2 champion
 Mick Jones
 Dave Walter — Series 7 and 8 champion
 Mark Everitt† — Series 4 champion
 Neil Parsley — Series 7 runner-up
 Gary Johnson — Series 7 heat finalist

South Africa
 Kirsten Meyer
 Marelize Le Roux
 Marna Dipenaar
 Tammy Le Roux
 Nivea Sekele
 Nicky Seger
 Michael Toll
 Jason Van Der Walt
 Charles Steenkamp
 Shilo Bunce
 Remington Minkhawile
 Juan Pretorius

†Overall Series Winner
 1 Ward replaced Pauline Shirt after she was injured during Atlaspheres in her preliminary heat

Gladiators

United Kingdom
 Fox — Tammy Baker
 Gold — Lize Van Der Walt1
 Rio — Jane Omorogbe
 Siren — Alison Paton
 Vogue — Suzanne Cox
 Ace — Warren Furman
 Cobra — Michael Willson
 Hunter — James Crossley
 Rhino — Mark Smith
 Saracen — Mike Lewis

1 Notably, Gold had not competed in domestic British competition since Series 6, some three years before the series was filmed. Her brother, Jason, also appeared as a contender for the South African team.

South Africa
 Force — Joanne Rossi
 Fire — Magdalena Wysoczanska
 Ice — Marion Hind
 Lightning — Rene Roberts Patel
 Nightshade — Nelly Mokohoana
 Sahara — Christy Skoglund
 Thunder — Jade Russell
 Blade — Clint Walters
 Giant — Matthew Haldenby
 Granite — Garth Collins
 Spider — Sergio Capellino
 Tusk — Shannon Gaskin
 Warrior — Franco Kawaza
 Wildebeest — Andries Coetzee

Events
 Atlaspheres — The MTN version of Atlaspheres follows a different format to the original. Five giant bowling pins are positioned across the arena. The contender has 60 seconds to knock as many of the pins down as possible whilst the Gladiator tries to prevent them from scoring. The contender can only move in a circular motion, and once a pin is missed, they cannot go back for it. Each silver pin is worth 2 points and the big red pin is worth 4.
 Duel — This event follows the same rules as the original incarnation. 
 Hang Tough — This event follows the same rules as the original incarnation.
 Hit and Run — Known as the Demolition Run, this event follows the same rules as the original incarnation.
 Suspension Bridge — This event follows the same rules as the original incarnation.
 The Wall — Known as the MTN Mountain, this event follows the same rules as the original incarnation.

Competition results
Bold indicates the winner of each competition. Like the Australian series, only four events are played in each episode prior to the Eliminator.

Gladiators (franchise)